The FSO Polonez is a motor vehicle that was developed in Poland in collaboration with Fiat and produced by Fabryka Samochodów Osobowych from 1978 to 2002. It was based on the Polski Fiat 125p platform with a new hatchback design by Giorgetto Giugiaro. It was available in a variety of body styles that included two- and four-door compact-sized cars, station wagons, as well as commercial versions that included pickup truck, cargo van, and ambulance versions. Production totaled more than one million units excluding the pickup truck and van variants. The Polonez was marketed in other nations and was popular in its domestic market until Poland joined the European Union in 2004.

The car's name comes from the Polish dance, the polonaise, and was chosen through a readers' poll conducted by the newspaper Życie Warszawy.

In 2021, about 33,000 vehicles were still registered in Poland.

Background
The Polonez was based on the Polski Fiat 125p that Fabryka Samochodów Osobowych (FSO) built under licence from Fiat. The internal components, including modernised 1.3/1.5 Litre engines, (pistons and carburetor), the chassis, and other mechanicals, were from the Polski Fiat 125p, but the body was an entirely new liftback body designed in the early 1970s by Centro Stile Fiat as a new prototype of Fiat. After the Polish side started co-operation with Fiat over a new car, the original design was changed due to Polish requirements. The car was meant to be equipped with Fiat's 2.0 Litre DOHC engines in the 1980s, but financial problems at the time made the purchase of a licence from Fiat impossible. This is also why the 125p was produced simultaneously alongside the Polonez for more than a decade. Moreover, mechanical modernisation only took place when it could be applied to both cars. This situation finally changed after the production of the 125p ended in 1991.

An advantage of the FSO Polonez is its safety in an accident, especially compared to many of its rivals from the Eastern Bloc. In 1978, it was the only Eastern European car built to pass U.S. crash tests. Crash tests were performed in 1994 according to EU safety regulations so that the Polonez could be exported worldwide. They proved the car to be very safe. The Caro 1.9 GLD hitting a concrete block (without an energy-absorbing metal cage) with 40% of the front at  survived very well. All doors could be opened without any difficulty, there were no critical injuries for passengers, and no fuel leakage occurred.

Polonez range 

The Polonez range was expanded to encompass a wide range of bodies. These included:

 Hatchback (as originally introduced)
 Sedan (FSO Polonez Atu, also known as FSO Celina on some export markets) introduced in 1996 (first presented in 1994)
 Station wagon introduced in 1999 (first presented in 1994)
 Pick-up called Truck (introduced in 1988)
 Extended Pick-up (with small rear seats)
 Truck Roy (long body like Caro/Atu but in pick-up form) (introduced around 1997)
 Special-bodied service vehicle
 Special edition for the Polish Fire Brigade
 Cargo LAV (Polonez Caro with higher roof and longer rear part made of PVC put on metal crates - this body is what the Ambulance was built on) introduced around 1993
 Coupé (three doors, about 50 made, side doors and B pillar are wider, C pillar is different)
 Three-doors (like normal Polonez but lacks rear doors, it is estimated that 300 were made)

There were also many prototypes including: a pickup made using the rear part of Polski Fiat 125p pick-up, chassis cab (without frame in the rear), 4x4 off-roader (Analog), hydro-pneumatic suspension, another sedan version (very different from Atu/Celina), 4x4 Truck w/o offroad suspension and van.

Polonez (1978–1991)

Development
 1970 Fiat launched ESV (Experimental Safety Vehicle) project.
 1974 FSO chose Fiat's ESV prototype as the base of a new car. FSO's designer Zbigniew Watson joins Walter de Silva to convert the ESV project to the size of a Fiat 125 floor and design the interior and all body details. The project is known as "type 137".
 1975 Fiat prepared prototypes of type 137 named "Polski" and sent them to FSO.

Debut
In May 1978, mass production commenced. The official premiere of the FSO Polonez 1500 and FSO Polonez 1300 took place. The FSO Polonez 2000 Rally with a 2-liter Fiat DOHC engine was displayed sometime later. In 1979 the FSO Polonez 2000, sold mostly to government officials, appeared. The Polonez 2000 has a Fiat twin-cam engine with 1,995 cc, a 5-speed gearbox, a 0–100 km/h acceleration of 12.0 seconds, and a  top speed. The FSO Polonez 2000 Rally debuted in the Rallye Monte Carlo. In 1980 the FSO Polonez 1300 and 1500 three-door appeared. With the same short front doors as the five-door version, it was produced from 1979 until 1981 with about 300 units.

In 1981 a more economical version of the Polonez started being produced. This was sold without black side rubbing strips between the front and rear wheel, chrome bumper strips, rear window wiper-washer, fog lamps, luggage cover, and tachometer. Basic vinyl was used on the seats and in the luggage compartment. It was sold in the domestic market, usually for U.S. dollar payments.

In 1981 and 1983, the FSO Polonez Coupé with proper three-door bodywork was introduced. It was the first FSO model to feature electronic ignition and fuel economiser owing to a supply of pre-heated air to the suction manifold. Only a few dozen were produced.

In 1983 The Polski Fiat 125p was renamed FSO 125p, after FSO's licence rights to the Fiat badge expired. The new naming system for FSO's models was as follows:

FSO 125p: 1.3 L, 1.3 ML, 1.3 ME, 1.5 C, 1.5 L, 1.5 ML, 1.5 MS, 1.5 ME
FSO Polonez 1.3 C, 1.3 CE, 1.3 L, 1.3 LE, 1.5 C, 1.5 CE, 1.5 L, 1.5 LS, 1.5 LE, 1.5 X, 2000.

Also in 1983, the FSO Polonez 2.0 D Turbo with an Italian VM Motori HR 488 engine of 1,995 cc appeared. Fuel consumption is 7.1/10.6/10.0 L/100 km, and approximately 100 cars were produced to this specification.

 1984 FSO Polonez 2000 Turbo 3-door - rally car, never got rally homologation, bodywork like Coupé version, but without the Coupé-like front. This car received a turbocharged 1,995 cc Fiat engine, in some variants combined with a supercharger for better torque.
 1985 FSO Polonez - first five-door cars with a Coupé-like front
 1986 FSO Polonez 1.5 Turbo mass production launched. Also a rally version 1.5C Turbo known as "Iron Rain" official premiere.

FSO Polonez - first cars with additional rear-side windows in the C-pillar.

In 1987, the FSO Polonez 1.6 LE appeared. Very few were made.

FSO Polonez modifications: stamped rear spoiler instead of plastic one, new model labels on the sticking foil, new version coding system with an 'S' supposedly meaning that the car had the additional rear-side windows in the C-pillar, a feature was often broken in practice. The versions available were:

1,3 SCE, 1.3 SL, 1.3 SLE, 1,5 CE, 1.5 L, 1,5 LE, 1,5 SCE, 1,5 SL, 1,5 SLE, 1,6 SLE, 2.0 SLE

In 1988, the FSO Polonez 1500 Turbo with AA 1,481 cc engine,  at 7,000 rpm,  at 3,200 rpm, 8,5 s,  appeared. This was a rally version only, built to group A specifications. Following this competition version, the FSO Polonez 1.5 SLE Turbo with a turbocharged AA engine was introduced in December 1989. The Turbo Polonez' were built mainly in rally versions (group N), although on special request a Turbo-kit could be installed in mass-produced cars.

 1988 Prototypes of the FSO Polonez in an ambulance and van versions based on the FSO Truck (pick-up). Lowered chassis and an additional right-side door were added features.

In 1989, the '89 FSO Polonez appeared, the facelift included a rear boot lid lowered to the bumper level, new rear lamps, a rear window wiper-washer placed horizontally, and side repeaters placed horizontally near the front doors. In January 1989, the first catalysed Polonezes (1500 only) were shown at the Amsterdam Auto Show. Simultaneously, a version with an Italian FNM-built (Fratelli Negri Motori)  turbo-diesel and a five-speed manual appeared (called the "Polonez Piedra 1.3 Turbodiesel"), specifically for the Belgian market.

Stratopolonez 
A one off version of FSO Polonez dubbed Stratopolonez (also known as FSO Polonez 2500 Racing) uses Lancia Stratos components salvaged from a crashed such car that was driven by Andrzej Jaroszewicz, the son of Prime Minister Piotr Jaroszewicz back in 1977 on Rally Poland. He failed to complete the rally, due to the Lancia Stratos crashing into the tree.

The creation of the vehicle was done by Ośrodek Badawczo-Rozwojowy FSO (FSO Research and Development Center) in 1978. The car uses an FSC Star radiator located in the front (as a counterweight due to the car being now mid-engined), engine output was improved to 280 PS, and doesn't share spoilers with FSO Polonez 2000 Rally.

This car was raced until 1985. Drivers were Andrzej Jaroszewicz, Adam Polak, Maciej Stawowiak, and Marian Bublewicz. Marian gave an improvement such as adding wider rear wheel arches and strengthening areas around the windshield. The vehicle then went to Museum of Technology, Warsaw afterward. In the year 2000, the vehicle was restored by students of Warsaw Motor Technical College as part of their diploma thesis.

Gallery

Polonez Caro (1991–1997) 

1991 marked the end of FSO 125p production. Along with this, FSO's 1,295 cc engine ended production. FSO imports to the United Kingdom were temporarily stopped. On the other hand, the facelifted FSO Polonez Caro appeared. It had new headlamps and grille (similar to the design of the FSO Wars, a prototype car was supposed to be the successor to Polonez), new front and rear bumpers, steering wheel, new rooflet over instruments, and improved front crash safety. The Caro GLD was sold across mainland Europe.

The other versions in pricelist:
FSO Polonez Caro 1.5 GLE - 
FSO Polonez Caro 1.6 GLE - 
FSO Polonez Caro 2.0 GLE - Ford's  engine  and gearbox from the Ford Sierra (approx. 1,000 units)

 1992 FSO Polonez 1.5 GLI, 1.6 GLI with ABIMEX single-point injection, with or without catalytic converter.
 1993 (August) Polonez after the next facelift: front and rear track  wider, fresh air inlet moved from hood to the front of the windscreen, better front and rear wipe-wash kinematics, longer arms and larger wiped area, changes in the dashboard: circular speedometer and rev counter, four instead of two fresh air outlets, illuminated switches, and remote headlamps shaft regulator.
(December) FSO Polonez 1.4 GLI 16V with Rover 1396 cc engine,  @ 6000 rpm,  @ 5000 rpm, 11,9 s, with or without catalytic converter.

 1994 FSO (Prima) 1.4 GLI 16V - race car with Rover 1396 cc engine,  @ 7200 rpm,  @ 6000 rpm, took part in Dutch race competitions.

FSO Polonez Sedan prototype - later produced as the FSO Atu - with 4-door sedan bodywork, with a completely new dashboard and upholstery (project by FSO), new rear suspension: rigid rear axle with longitudinal wishbones, reaction bars, and coil springs. Rear lamps same as in the Caro version.

Two prototypes of the FSO Polonez Kombi (station wagon).
The next prototype: FSO Analog 4WD, light off-road car with 4-door pick-up bodywork and four-wheel drive.

Export to the UK restarted: FSO Caro (Polonez 1.6 and 1.9 D) and FSO Pick-up (Truck)

 1995 The next prototype of the 4-door FSO Polonez Sedan was introduced at the 1995 Poznan Motor Show - the car had new a dashboard (see 1994) and new rear lamps.

Girling-Lucas brakes were introduced.

 1996 (February) First series of the new FSO Atu 1.6 GLI sold - produced from December 1995 to February 1996. (June) Mass production of the FSO Polonez Atu 1.6 GLI and FSO Polonez Atu 1.4 GLI 16V, very few cars in FSO Polonez Atu 1.9 GLD specification with a Diesel engine. The FSO Atu was renamed to FSO Polonez Atu after protests by the ATU insurance company.

Production of the FSO Polonez Caro 1.9 GLD stopped.

End of export to the Netherlands, the last foreign market for Polonez passenger versions; the last offering in the Netherlands consisted of:
FSO Prima (Polonez Caro) 1.6 GLI
FSO Prima (Polonez Caro) 1.4 GLI 16V
FSO Celina (Atu) 1.6 GLI

Engines

Gallery

Polonez Caro Plus (1997–2003) 

 1997 (March) FSO Polonez mass production of the new Caro Plus and Atu Plus - the new front grill, bumpers, new dashboard. (summer)

 During the same time FSO-Daewoo started producing the Leganza from knock-down kits for the Polish market, occupying much of the same segment as the Polonez but offering much modern features and conveniences.

 1998 (May) The first public show of the station wagon prototype: FSO Polonez Kombi Plus.
FSO Truck was marketed in Italy by the Daewoo dealer network.

 1999 (February) The test production of the new Daewoo-FSO Polonez Kombi 1.6 GSi MPI. (April) The mass production of the Daewoo-FSO Polonez Kombi in passenger (final drive ratio 3,9) and van versions (final drive ratio 4,3) with 1.6 engine (MPI). The new steering wheel (borrowed from the Daewoo Nubira) and armrests were introduced. The start of marketing was planned for June 1999. In May was the Official premiere of the Daewoo-FSO Polonez Kombi 1.6 GSi MPI on the Poznan Motor Show.
 2000 The new shape of the FSO label in the front grill. (summer) Approx. 200 FSO Polonez cars produced with air conditioning, sold in summer months for an extra zl 1,200 (alloy wheels included).
 2001 (summer) Small series of FSO Polonez with air conditioning, sold in summer months for an extra zl 1,000.
 2002 (the end of the first quarter) The last passenger FSO Polonez car leaves the assembly line. Production has been stopped (meant to be stopped temporarily at first though). Daewoo-FSO did not make any official ceremony at the end of Polonez production.
 2003 end of production Truck Plus.
 2004 a new company, Polska Fabryka Samochodów (PFS) tried to restart Polonez Truck production, renaming it Poltruck (meant to have a modified body, to be introduced a bit later though), but it eventually failed, leaving only a small number of test vehicles.

Engines

Gallery

Export markets
Polonez was exported to many countries, including Netherlands, Yugoslavia, France, Argentina, Bolivia, UK, China, Greece, Ireland, Italy, Denmark, Belgium, Germany, Syria, Uruguay, Jordan, Norway, Finland, Egypt, Spain, Hungary, and others.  Complete knock down (CKD) cars were assembled by El Nasr (in conjunction with Arab American Vehicles) in Egypt from 1983 until 1993, succeeding the locally assembled 125p in that market. In the late 1980s, a batch of 167 Polonez hatchbacks was exported to New Zealand. They were also exported to Chile and Colombia (in the latter country also used as police cars and taxicabs) from the late 1980s to early 1990s. In some countries, the FSO Polonez was sold as FSO Celina, FSO Prima, or FSO Caro. A few were also exported to Albania and the Soviet Union but did not find success there.

Imports to the UK ceased in 1997, though sales continued in some parts of Western Europe - including France - for at least a year afterward. They were withdrawn from those markets due to a combination of more stringent emissions requirements and declining demand.

Gallery

Dongfanghong
In China, the Polonez platform was produced by YTO Group as the Dongfanghong/Yituo LT5021/LT5022 series, though with many modifications (trim pieces came from the Volkswagen Santana and power was sourced from locally produced 1.4L engines). These cars were built with locally-made spare parts for imported Polonez - common cars in China during that time, but with many other local parts substituted in (Dongfanghong was also working with Fiat at the time on tractor technology, which may have also influenced the choice of a car); a selling point for the vehicles were that their parts were easily interchangeable with Polonez. These cars were not nearly as successful as their actual Polonez counterparts, and none are known to survive today.

Legacy
The FSO Polonez suffered from relatively poor performance (except for those models equipped with the Fiat 2.0 DOHC, the  Ford 2.0 SOHC, or the Rover 1.4 MPI 16V). Polonez parts were relatively cheap and readily available. After 1992, quality began to increase, especially after 1995 when Daewoo started its cooperation with FSO. Since 1997, the last production models (the PLUS series) offered new features such as air conditioning.

Production ended in 2002, after 24 years. The relatively low price of the Polonez was seen as the main advantage over other cars. But demand slumped, and the last versions of the Polonez produced were the Truck versions, valued for their low price, reliability, and high load capability: up to  depending on the version.

The Polonez was a common sight in Central and Eastern Europe, particularly in its home country of Poland, but since Poland became a member of the European Union on 1 May 2004, the car was rapidly replaced by relatively cheap and tax-free used cars from Western Europe.

For many years the Polonez has been a popular choice for participants in the Złombol Charity Rally. In 2018 around 300 teams (~40% of all teams) used different versions of the Polonez in this event.

References

External links

 Official web of the FSO Polonez 
 History of Stratopolonez
 Stratopolonez on AutoGEN.pl

Cars of Poland
Polonez
Cars introduced in 1978
Science and technology in Poland
Group 4 (racing) cars
1980s cars
1990s cars
2000s cars